The 1887 Open Championship was the 27th Open Championship, held 16 September at Prestwick Golf Club in Prestwick, South Ayrshire, Scotland. Willie Park Jr. won the Championship, a stroke ahead of Bob Martin.

The Open was played in almost incessant rain and a cross wind. Willie Campbell was the warm favourite amongst the local crowd and was followed by the majority of the spectators. Willie Park, Jr. and Willie Fernie were paired together in the preceding group.

Campbell made a good start reaching the turn in 35 and eventually finishing with a 77. This was enough for a four stroke lead over Bob Martin and Archie Simpson with David Brown and Willie Park Jr. a further shot behind. Ben Sayers took 83 and they were the only six players to score better than 85.

In the second round Campbell reached the turn in 39. Park had reached the same hole in 37 but was still three behind. Playing a few groups behind Martin reached the turn in 38 and was level with Park at that point. The other contenders had faded away. Reaching the 16th hole Campbell was still two ahead of Park. Park had an excellent three at the hole. Campbell tried to carry the fairway bunker but his ball landed in the thick grass at the top of it. "He made a desperate effort to force it onto the green, but it proved futile, and five strokes were lost in the bunker". He eventually took nine and his chances of winning were gone. Park finished with two fives for a total of 161. In the second round he didn't have a score worse than five and wasn't in a single bunker in either round. Campbell finished one better than Park on the final two holes but was still three behind on 164. Martin couldn't quite match Park's good finish and ended a stroke behind on 162.

The bunker at the 16th became known as “Willie Campbell’s Grave”.

Final leaderboard
Source:

Friday, 16 September 1887

References

External links
Prestwick 1887 (Official site)

The Open Championship
Golf tournaments in Scotland
Open Championship
Open Championship
Open Championship